The following is a list of lists of legendary creatures, beings and entities from the folklore record. Entries consist of legendary and unique creatures, not of particularly unique individuals of a commonly known species.

Alphabetical lists
 List of legendary creatures (A)
 List of legendary creatures (B)
 List of legendary creatures (C)
 List of legendary creatures (D)
 List of legendary creatures (E)
 List of legendary creatures (F)
 List of legendary creatures (G)
 List of legendary creatures (H)
 List of legendary creatures (I)
 List of legendary creatures (J)
 List of legendary creatures (K)
 List of legendary creatures (L)
 List of legendary creatures (M)
 List of legendary creatures (N)
 List of legendary creatures (O)
 List of legendary creatures (P)
 List of legendary creatures (Q)
 List of legendary creatures (R)
 List of legendary creatures (S)
 List of legendary creatures (T)
 List of legendary creatures (U)
 List of legendary creatures (V)
 List of legendary creatures (W)
 List of legendary creatures (X)
 List of legendary creatures (Y)
 List of legendary creatures (Z)

Specific area-related lists
 List of legendary creatures from Argentina
 List of legendary creatures from China
 List of legendary creatures from France
 List of legendary creatures from Germany
 List of legendary creatures from Greece
 List of legendary creatures from Hindu
 List of legendary creatures from Japan
 List of legendary creatures from Malaysia
 List of legendary creatures from Manipur
 List of legendary creatures from Myanmar
 List of legendary creatures from Philippines
 List of legendary creatures from Slavic

Creature type-based lists

See also 

 Bestiary
 Lists of fictional species
 List of urban legends

 
Lists of fictional life forms